Lumajang Regency is a Regency (kabupaten) located in the East Java province of Indonesia. It covers an area of 1,790.90 sq. km, and had a population of 1,006,458 at the 2010 Census and 1,119,251 at the 2020 Census. It shares its land borders with Jember Regency (to the east), Probolinggo Regency (to the north), and Malang Regency (to the west), while it borders the Indian Ocean to the south.

Geography
Lumajang is located approximately 150 km southeast of Surabaya. Its temperature ranges between 24 °C to 32 °C.

History
Lumajang is one of the ancient cities in Java which still exist up to this day. According to Mula Malurung artifact (dated 1177 Saka), Lumajang was then ruled by King Nararyya Kirana Sminingrat. The date of the artifact, which is 15 December 1255 in the Gregorian calendar, was decided as the date of establishment of Lumajang. Menhirs found in the districts of Senduro, Gucialit, Sukodono, Klakah, and Lumajang reveal that in prehistoric times, the present area of Lumajang had already been inhabited long before the date of Mula Malurung artifact.

Administrative districts
Lumajang Regency is divided into 21 districts (kecamatan),  tabulated below with their areas and their populations at the 2010 Census) and the 2020 Census.

The districts are further subdivided into 202 villages (rural desa and urban kelurahan).

Demographics
The population comprises Javanese, Madurese, Chinese Indonesians, and Tenggerese.

Climate
Lumajang has a tropical savanna climate (Aw) with moderate to little rainfall from May to September and heavy to very heavy rainfall from October to April.

Places of interest

 Agrowisata Royal Family (agro, fruit picking centers, outbound, and family vacation spot)
 Selokambang—a natural swimming pool
 The Triangle Lake, which consists of three crater lakes (Ranu Klakah, Ranu Bedali, Ranu Pakis)
 Ranu Pane, Ranu Regulo, Ranu Kumbolo—crater lakes at the slope of Mount Semeru
 Mount Semeru
 Tetes Cave
 Mandara Giri Temple
 Piket Nol (highway place where we can see Cold Lava from Semeru)
 Tumpak Sewu Waterfalls

References

External links

 Official website
 Tourism site

Regencies of East Java